Thomas Enqvist was the defending champion, but lost in the semifinals to Andre Agassi.

Andre Agassi won the final after receiving a walkover from Mark Philippoussis due to neck strain.

Players

Draw

Main draw

Play-offs

External links
Official Colonial Classic website
2000 Colonial Classic results

Kooyong Classic
Col